The Tarantula is a fictional character name used by several characters, usually supervillains, appearing in American comic books published by Marvel Comics. Most of these characters are primarily depicted as wearing a red and blue suit with retractable blades.

Publication history
The original version of Tarantula (Anton Miguel Rodriguez) was introduced in The Amazing Spider-Man #134 (July 1974). Writer Gerry Conway recalled how he created the character:  Acting as a patriotic enforcer for the oppressive dictatorship of the fictional South American country of Delvadia (essentially a Delvadian equivalent to Captain America), his defining marks are his red stretch costume with a black tarantula on its chest and the poisonous spikes attached to his gloves and boots. The character was killed off in the early 1980s, but the Tarantula identity has been carried on by a series of successors (such as Luis Alvarez and Jacinda Rodriguez). A modern version of Tarantula (Maria Vasquez) is introduced in Heroes For Hire vol. 2 #1 (October 2006).

A character with the Tarantula name previously appeared in Ghost Rider #2 (April 1967) with no connection between this character and any of the other depictions.

Fictional character biographies

Anton Miguel Rodriguez
Antonio "Anton" Miguel Rodriguez is the first character to use the Tarantula codename. 

He was a revolutionary terrorist in the small fictional South American republic of Delvadia, and was expelled from his small organization after murdering a guard for no reason during a robbery. Anton then went over to the side of the repressive fascist-dictatorship government, where the Tarantula identity was created for him to serve as a government operative and his country's counterpart of a patriotic symbol. After alienating his masters, Anton embarks on a criminal career in the United States. He hijacks a Hudson River dayliner to rob the passengers and hold them for ransom; his plan, however, is disrupted by Spider-Man and the Punisher. Anton escapes prison with the original Jackal's help who sought revenge on Spider-Man; however, is again defeated by Spider-Man. Anton is then hired by Lightmaster to assist Kraven the Hunter in committing various kidnappings and murders, but is again thwarted by Spider-Man. Anton then joins forces with Senor Suerte to steal the "Madbombs" and use for extortion, but this time is defeated by Captain America.

Anton is hired by the Brand Corporation to silence an informer, but is again thwarted by Spider-Man. The Brand Corporation then orders him to kill Spider-Man. In an attempt to bestow him with spider-powers, Anton is injected with a mutagenic serum and placed in an electrolyte bath. The Will o' The Wisp disrupts the mutagenic process, causing him to start transforming into a gigantic, monstrous, spider-like being. He falls into Jamaica Bay, but survives the plunge and continues to mutate, and then battles Spider-Man atop a tall New York City building. Horrified and disgusted with what he has turned into, he leaps off the building, begging for the police officers gathered below to kill him. Hit by a hail of gunfire, Anton strikes the street below and dies.

During the Dead No More: The Clone Conspiracy storyline, a clone of the character is among the clones that were created thanks to the new Jackal's New U Technologies. He was involved in a fight with the other cloned supervillains until it was broken up by a clone of the Prowler.

In a prelude to the "Hunted" storyline, Anton is among the animal-themed characters captured by the Taskmaster and the Black Ant on Kraven the Hunter's behalf. He is among those whom Arcade publicly reveals as the Savage Six.

Luis Alvarez
Luis Alvarez is the second character to use the Tarantula codename. He was a special government operative and a former captain in the Delvadian militia, but not given to terrorist activities. Acting more as a death squad/government enforcer, Alvarez is chosen by Delvadian government officials to be the second Tarantula, and undergoes a mutagenic treatment to increase his already-considerable physical abilities, wearing an identical costume. He is sent to the United States by the Delvadian government to eliminate political refugees from that country, and to kill Spider-Man for what happened to his predecessor, but Spider-Man and Captain America defeat him. Working as a mercenary, Alvarez teams up with the Chameleon to eliminate Spider-Man where he nearly kills Flash Thompson, but this plan failed and he is defeated by Spider-Man and the Black Cat. Alvarez later battles the Punisher and Batroc the Leaper. Eventually, Alvarez is caught and murdered by the Jury.

Third version
An unnamed character is the third individual to use the Tarantula codename. 

A patron at the Bar With No Name, he and several other villains get into a brawl with Spider-Man and Kraven the Hunter. The Tarantula later fights the Runaways in Van Nuys, and is defeated by a "debugging incantation" cast by Nico Minoru.

Years later, the Tarantula resurfaces as an ally of the Black Cat, and as one of the villains taking advantage of the gang war raging in the Third Precinct.

The Tarantula was among the supervillains fought by Old Man Logan for Mysterio's location, and Miss Sinister telepathically took the Tarantula's information then killed him.

Jacinda Rodriguez
Jacinda Rodriguez is the fourth character to use the Tarantula codename and the daughter of Anton Miguel Rodriguez. She and Marie Batroc were hired by the East Winds to go after Agent X, the Taskmaster and the Outlaw, however, the Taskmaster surprised both Jacinda and her partner and gunned down the two women. Jacinda is later seen as an operative of Delvadia alongside the Devil-Spider, assisting Spider-Man and Mockingbird in confronting El Facóquero (a.k.a. the Warthog), Delvadia's drug lord and Norman Osborn's body double.

Maria Vasquez
Maria Vasquez is the fifth character to use the Tarantula codename and a member of the Heroes for Hire. 

Maria acts alongside the Heroes for Hire as the Superhuman Registration Act's enforcers for Iron Man.

While the Heroes for Hire investigate a black-market operation, a hit gets put out on the entire team; Maria experiences this when visiting the gravesite of her sister Rosa Vasquez that was killed in the Stamford Incident while arguing with her father Fernandez Vasquez preferring a safer profession of putting her intelligence to good use. After her father is killed by ninjas, Maria killed the ninjas herself and personally confronts Ricadonna but was also unable to avenge her father as desired.

The Heroes for Hire are next paid to put a stop to a dangerous group of thieves who had been using advanced exoskeletons to aid in robberies regardless of collateral damage or death left behind; the group's investigation resulted in Maria, Misty Knight, the Black Cat and Colleen Wing stopping the Grim Reaper and the Man-Ape with the Statue of Liberty's destruction.

The Heroes for Hire are hired by S.H.I.E.L.D. thanks to Paladin to capture Moon-Boy and Devil Dinosaur at the Savage Land for study before getting recruited into something else, resulting in Maria's confrontation with the Scorpion. She gets tortured due to Humbug turning on the Heroes for Hire for the Brood queen (which resulted in one of many reasons behind the group's disbanding). During this time, Maria's relationship with Shang-Chi turned intimate.

Kaine

Kaine, a clone of Peter Parker, used the Tarantula alias for his hulking Man-Spider form during the "Spider-Island" storyline among the various Man-Spiders controlled by the original Jackal and Adriana Soria.

Powers and abilities
Anton Miguel Rodriguez was a great athlete with incredible agility, leaping skills and excellent in hand-to-hand combat. Additionally, he wore gloves with retractable razor-sharp finger claws and boots with two retractable razor-sharp spikes loaded with drugs that would render his victim unconscious, or other harmful or lethal drugs and poisons. He was educated in military school, was an excellent hand-to-hand combatant and was skilled in various martial arts, particularly in kickboxing. When he was mutated into a giant tarantula-like creature thanks to the Brand Corporation's mutagenic serum, he gained superhuman strength and the ability to adhere to surfaces. However, in his final mutation into a human-sized tarantula, while he possessed superhuman strength, his limbs were not structured to enable him to lift (press) weights. Just before his death, he developed the ability to shoot organic webbing from his buttocks.

Luis Alvarez had his strength, stamina, agility and reflexes enhanced to peak human levels, thanks to Dr. Karl Mendoza's formula. Like Rodriguez, he also wore retractable razor-sharp finger claws in his gloves, and two retractable razor-sharp spikes in his boots anointed with harmful or lethal drugs and poisons. Also, like his predecessor, he was educated in military school, was an excellent hand-to-hand combatant and was skilled in various martial arts, particularly in kickboxing.

Maria Vasquez is highly skilled in hand to hand combat. She is skilled in using the blades on her wrists and the toes of her boots as very effective weapons. She is also a skilled detective, capable of observation and forensic investigation, as well as an exceptional marksman who is also skilled in sharpshooting and knife throwing.

Other versions

Ultimate Marvel
The Ultimate universe equivalent of Tarantula is a clone of Peter Parker. Created by Doctor Octopus, the clone wears a black variant of Spider-Man's costume and displays Man-Spider inspired features (six arms, fangs and spiky hair), and possesses superhuman strength, reflexes and equilibrium, and a spider-sense. The Tarantula tries to prevent Kaine's kidnapping and mutation of Mary Jane Watson and later fights alongside his genetic template and Spider-Woman against his maker, but is killed as a result.

Earth-1048
During the Spider-Geddon storyline, the Earth-1048 version of Tarantula is shown to sport mechanical spider legs. He was robbing the Financial District when he was attacked by Spider-Man. After immobilizing the Tarantula with a web bomb, Spider-Man is visited by the Superior Spider-Man of Earth-616 (Otto Octavius's mind in Spider-Man's body) as the Tarantula breaks free. As the Superior Spider-Man gets in the way of the web bomb, the Tarantula gets away. The two later find the Tarantula robbing a research facility and defeat him, while the Superior Spider-Man's spider-bots disable the Tarantula's mechanical spider legs. Both Spider-Men swing off, while the Tarantula is arrested by the police.

In other media
 A variation of the Tarantula appears in the Spider-Man episode "Generations" Pt. 2, voiced by Valenzia Algarin. This version is a battle suit that sports Anton Miguel Rodriguez's colors and Maria Vasquez's wrist blades. The Chameleon pilots the suit while disguised as Maria Corazon to fight alongside the Dark Goblin, the Jackal and Swarm against the Spider-Team, but is defeated by Spider-Girl.
 The Maria Vasquez version of the Tarantula will appear in the MCU / Disney+ series Spider-Man: Freshman Year (2024).

References

External links
 Tarantula (Antonio Miguel Rodriguez) at Marvel.com
 Tarantula (Luis Alvarez) at Marvel.com
 
 Tarantula (Maria Vasquez) at Marvel.com 

Comics characters introduced in 1967
Comics characters introduced in 1988
Comics characters introduced in 2006
Characters created by Gerry Conway
Characters created by Ross Andru
Clone characters in comics
Marvel Comics characters with superhuman strength
Marvel Comics martial artists
Marvel Comics superheroes
Marvel Comics supervillains
Spider-Man characters